Jakub Szumski (born 6 March 1992 in Warsaw) is a Polish professional footballer who plays as a goalkeeper for Samsunspor. Besides Poland, he has played in Turkey.

Career
On 30 July 2012, he was loaned to Piast Gliwice until the end of the season. In July 2013 he signed a three-year deal with Piast.

Honours
Raków Częstochowa
Polish Cup: 2020–21

References

External links
 

1992 births
Living people
Polish footballers
Poland youth international footballers
Poland under-21 international footballers
Ekstraklasa players
I liga players
III liga players
Süper Lig players
TFF First League players
Legia Warsaw players
Legia Warsaw II players
Piast Gliwice players
Zagłębie Sosnowiec players
Raków Częstochowa players
Büyükşehir Belediye Erzurumspor footballers
Samsunspor footballers
Association football goalkeepers
Footballers from Warsaw
Polish expatriate footballers
Polish expatriate sportspeople in Turkey
Expatriate footballers in Turkey